SPUR is a nonprofit public policy organization focused on regional planning, housing, transportation, sustainability and resilience, economic justice, good government, and food and agriculture in the San Francisco Bay Area. Its full name is the San Francisco Bay Area Planning and Urban Research Association.

History 
SPUR's history dates back to 1910, when a group of city leaders came together to improve the quality of housing after the 1906 San Francisco earthquake and fire. That group, the San Francisco Housing Association, authored a report which led to the State Tenement House Act of 1911.

In the 1930s, the SFHA continued to advocate for housing concerns. In the 1940s, the SFHA merged with Telesis, a group of professors and urban planners from UC Berkeley's city planning program led by William Wurster, to become the San Francisco Planning and Housing Association. In 1942, the association landed a major success with the creation of San Francisco's Department of City Planning.

Starting in the 1950s, SFPHA advocated for urban renewal projects in San Francisco's largely Black Fillmore neighborhood that would ultimately displace at least 4,000 people  and remove 4,700 homes.  In 1959, the San Francisco Planning and Housing Association was reorganized into the San Francisco Planning and Urban Renewal Association. The organization served as community advisors for urban renewal projects in San Francisco's Western Addition and Fillmore neighborhoods as part of the federal urban redevelopment program.

 Under the guise of revitalization of San Francisco as the Bay Area's central city, and a supposed effort to curb suburban sprawl and channel growth back into the urban core, their projects would ultimately displace residents and provide less housing units. Urban renewal also had a strong cultural impact, destroying San Francisco's thriving Black creative community and world-famous jazz scene.

Ultimately, 883 businesses and 4,729 households were displaced and 2,500 Victorians were demolished during the Western Addition project that SPUR spearheaded. Today it is widely acknowledged that these projects, and others like them across the country, were detrimental to cities as they resulted in the destruction of tight-knit communities and the displacement of people of color, especially African Americans. In 1977, reflecting a growing focus on fiscal policy and an awareness of the failures of Modernist planning practices, the organization was renamed to the San Francisco Planning and Urban Research Association.

The group has helped shape some of the most important planning decisions in the region, from the founding of the Bay Area Rapid Transit system to the preservation of the Golden Gate National Recreation Area. In addition to shaping policy at the local level, SPUR has developed state legislation to advance affordable housing, sustainable transportation and renewable energy.

Current activities 
Over the years, the organization has grown to more than 6,000 members and has diversified its focus, analyzing subjects from sea-level rise and renewable energy to food security and guaranteed income programs. SPUR also provides annual analysis and voting recommendations on California, San Francisco San José and Oakland ballot measures.

In June 2009, SPUR moved into new headquarters at 654 Mission Street. This location houses the majority of SPUR's staff, as well as a gallery and meeting space for SPUR's regular hosted talks.

In  2012, SPUR initiated a long-range plan to work in all three of the Bay Area's central cities. The organization began work in San José in 2012 and Oakland in 2015, adding "Bay Area" to its name to reflect its broader scope.

In 2020, recognizing the role that planning, housing and transportation policies of the past have played in systemic racial injustice, SPUR made a shift to center equity in its work, publishing an equity platform and adding a policy area focused on economic justice. A year later, the organization published the SPUR Regional Strategy, a vision for the Bay Area of 2070 as an "equitable, sustainable and prosperous region where all people thrive".

The legacy of urban renewal continues today. Residents displaced through redevelopment moved into public housing, many of which have now fallen into dangerous disrepair. A 2012 report said, "A number of the black San Franciscans...shared a belief that they could be moved and shifted around at the whim of the city or the SFRA. Fillmore...community residents often view current redevelopment projects in their neighborhoods through a similar lens." SPUR has not materially addressed its legacy of what James Baldwin called "Negro removal” and the period of Urban Renewal is not acknowledged in their website's timeline of events.

See also 

 San Francisco Redevelopment Agency

References

External links

1959 establishments in California
Organizations based in San Francisco
Organizations established in 1959
Urban studies and planning schools